On June 29, 1837, a special election was held in  to fill a vacancy left by the death of Francis J. Harper (D) on March 18, 1837.

Election results

Naylor had been narrowly defeated in the 1836 election for the 3rd district.  He took his seat on September 4, 1837, at the start of the 1st session of the 25th Congress.

See also
List of special elections to the United States House of Representatives

References

Pennsylvania 1837 03
Pennsylvania 1837 03
1837 03
Pennsylvania 03
United States House of Representatives 03
United States House of Representatives 1837 03